The following article contains a year-by-year list and statistics of football topscorers in Liga MX (Mexican First Division).

Amateur Era Topscorers (1902-1943)

Professional Era (1943-Currently)

References

See also
Football in Mexico

Footballers in Mexico
Mexico
Association football player non-biographical articles